Poyra is a village in the Bozüyük District, Bilecik Province, Turkey. Its population is 140 (2021). The village mainly consists of Circassian people of the Hatuqway tribe and Muhacirs who were exiled from Bulgaria. Three languages are spoken in the village, Adyghe, Balkan Turkish and standart Turkish.

History 
The founders of the village were originally among the Circassians in Bulgaria who arrived in Bulgaria after Circassian genocide. They later migrated to Anatolia and first founded the village in the 1870s. The village was originally founded as Hatuqwaye, named after the Hatuqway tribe, where the inhabitants traced their descent from. Following the establishment of the Turkish Republic, the village was renamed to a Turkish word, and now is known as Poyra.

Culture 
The village mainly observes Circassian customs. There are also Balkan Turks in the village, who also speak Circassian and participate in Circassian weddings.

Notable people 

 Şamil Çinaz - footballer

References

Villages in Bozüyük District